Rosel Marie "Rosie" Boycott, Baroness Boycott (born 13 May 1951) is a British journalist and feminist.

Early life
The daughter of Major Charles Boycott and Betty Le Sueur Boycott, Rosel Marie "Rosie" Boycott was born in Saint Helier, Jersey. She was privately educated at the independent Cheltenham Ladies' College and read mathematics at the University of Kent.

Journalism career
Boycott worked for a year or so with Frendz radical magazine and in 1972, she co-founded the feminist magazine Spare Rib with Marsha Rowe. Later, both women became directors of Virago Press, a publishing concern committed to women's writing, with Carmen Callil, who had founded the company in 1973.

From 1992 to 1996, Boycott was editor of the UK edition of men's magazine Esquire. She headed both The Independent and its sister publication the Independent on Sunday (1996–98). 

Later, she edited the Daily Express (May 1998–January 2001), leaving soon after the newspaper was bought by Richard Desmond, who replaced her with Chris Williams.

Boycott is currently the travel editor for The Oldie magazine and hosts The Oldie Travel Awards each year.

Outside journalism

Boycott has presented the BBC Radio 4 programme A Good Read. She has sat on judging panels for literary awards, including chairing the panel responsible for choosing the 2001 Orange Prize for Fiction. She is also a media advisor for the Council of Europe. Boycott is a trustee of the Hay Festival in Wales and in Cartagena, Colombia. In March 2002, she denounced the New Labour government as "more reminiscent of a dictatorship than a free healthy democratic system", and announced her support for the Liberal Democrats. She was rumoured to have considered becoming a Parliamentary candidate.

Boycott made several appearances on Newsnight Review and other cultural and current affairs programmes, where the fact that she is a recovering alcoholic was discussed. She started drinking heavily again after losing her job at the Express. She was banned from driving for three years in September 2003 after crashing on the A303 in Wiltshire, injuring another driver. She was cut free from the wreckage. A court was told she had also been caught drunk driving the day before. Since her accident, Boycott has been running a farm in Somerset. She campaigned for Diana, Princess of Wales, in the 2002 BBC programme to find the greatest Briton.

On 5 August 2008, Boycott was appointed as the chair of "London Food" as part of Conservative Mayor Boris Johnson's attempt to help improve Londoners' access to healthy, locally produced and affordable food. In September 2007, she appeared in the third series of Hell's Kitchen, and was the first contestant to be voted off. In June 2009, she appeared on Celebrity MasterChef. The same month she was one of five volunteers who took part in a BBC series of three programmes entitled Famous, Rich and Homeless, about living penniless on the streets of London.

In June 2018, Boycott was nominated for a life peerage by the House of Lords Appointments Commission. She was created Baroness Boycott, of Whitefield in the County of Somerset, on 9 July.

Boycott is a supporter of the Women's Equality Party.

Personal life 
Boycott is married to Charles Howard KC. Her first marriage was to journalist David Leitch (1937–2004).

Publications
Batty Bloomers and Boycott: A Little Etymology of Eponymous Words, New York: Peter Bedrick Books, 1983, 
The Fastest Diet, London: Sphere Books, 1984. 
A Nice Girl Like Me: A Story of the Seventies, Pavanne Books, 1988, 
All for Love, London: Fontana, 1989, 
Our Farm: A Year in the Life of a Smallholding, London: Bloomsbury, 2007,

References

External links
"Sisterhood Revisited", Open Democracy public meeting at the Institute of Contemporary Arts, 7 March 2002
Rosie Boycott on Friends Magazine (Philm Freax)
Simon Hattenstone, "Rosie Outlook", The Guardian (Media Guardian), 30 July 2002.
Rosie's Hell's Kitchen profile
The Oldie magazine
Knight Ayton Management page

1951 births
Living people
People's peers
People educated at Cheltenham Ladies' College
Alumni of the University of Kent
British feminists
British newspaper editors
People from Saint Helier
The Independent editors
Daily Express people
Women newspaper editors
Women's Equality Party people
The Independent on Sunday editors
Life peeresses created by Elizabeth II
British women journalists